The Tempest 23 is an American trailerable sailboat designed in 1962 by Philip Rhodes and Richard D. Carlson.

Production
The design was built by the O'Day Corp. in the United States from 1964 to 1968, with 390 boats built, but it is now out of production.

Design
The Tempest 23 is a recreational keelboat, built predominantly of fiberglass, with wood trim. It has a masthead sloop rig, a spooned raked stem; a raised counter, angled transom; a skeg-mounted rudder controlled by a tiller and a fixed fin keel. It displaces  and carries  of ballast.

The sail plan consists of a 115.00 sq. ft. mainsail, 113.10 sq. ft. jib and 339.00 sq. ft. spinnaker. It can be sailed with a Tri-radial headsail.

The boat is normally fitted with a small  outboard motor for docking and maneuvering.

The design has sleeping accommodation for two people, with a double "V"-berth in the bow cabin. The galley is located on the port side just forward of the companionway ladder. The galley is equipped with a two-burner stove. The head is located opposite the galley on the straboard side.

Operational history
In a 2010 review Steve Henkel wrote, "the O'Day Tempest 23 (not to be confused with the similarly named O'Day International Tempest, an open-cockpit racing machine) is a classic, attractive, and wholesome design for basic overnight cruising. Best features: Relatively long overhangs and low freeboard give this boat a sleek, graceful look typical of Philip Rhodes' designs. Flotation under cockpit sole and V-berth is a good safety feature. Her broader beam and deeper draft compared to the Cape Cod Marlin ... help to make her more weatherly and stiff, despite the Marlin’s heavier but closer-to-the-surface ballast. On the other hand, the two Pearson comp[etitors]s [the Pearson 23 Sloop and Pearson 23 Cat] surpass the Tempest in weatherliness and stiffness for the same reasons. Worst features: Her keel is iron rather than lead, requiring diligent maintenance to prevent deterioration from rust. Lack of a good place to put a portable cooler keeps her from qualifying as more than a basic overnighter, and overall space below is less than all her comp[etitor]s, partly due to her reduced headroom. She is known to sail slower than her PHRF rating,"

See also

 Day Sailer
 Dolphin 24
 Finn
 Firefly
 Flying Dutchman

References

Further reading
 
  has material on this boat.
 O'Day Sailboats and Yachts from Bangor Punta Catalog: GG Archives

External links

 
 O'Day Tempest 23' Restoration and Information Site
 Oday 23 Sailboat Photo Gallery
 O'Day Tempest Owner Reviews

Keelboats
1960s sailboat type designs
Sailing yachts
Trailer sailers
Sailboat type designs by Philip Rhodes
Sailboat types built by O'Day Corp.